Amantis aeta is a species of praying mantis native to the Philippines.

See also
List of mantis genera and species

References

aeta
Mantodea of Southeast Asia
Insects of the Philippines
Insects described in 1920